This is a list of Members of Parliament (MPs) elected to the Jatiya Sangsad (National Parliament of Bangladesh) by Bangladeshi constituencies for the 9th Parliament of the Bangladesh.

It includes both MPs elected at the 2008 general election, held on 29 December 2008, and nominated women's members for reserved seat and those subsequently elected in by-elections.

Members

Members of the Reserved Women's Seat

References 

Members of the Jatiya Sangsad by term
Jatiya Sangsad